The Singaporean Certificate of Identity is an international travel document issued by the Immigration and Checkpoints Authority to Singaporean permanent residents who are stateless.

Use
A holder of a Certificate of Identity can enter Germany and Hungary visa-free for a maximum of 90 days within a 180-day period.  In the case of Germany, for holders of a COI to enter visa-free, their travel document must be endorsed and issued under the terms of the Convention relating to the Status of Stateless Persons of 28 September 1954.  However, as Singapore is not a signatory to the 1954 Stateless Persons Convention, in practice the visa exemption to Germany does not apply to any holder of the COI.  However, COI holders can nonetheless qualify for a visa exemption to Hungary since the Hungarian government does not require their travel document to be issued under the terms of the 1954 Stateless Persons Convention.

References

External links
Apply for Certificate of Identity (COI)

Border guards
International travel documents
Identity documents